Those marked in bold have later been capped at full International level.

Group A

Denmark

Head coach: Hans Brun Larsen

England

Head coach: Dick Bate

Finland

Head coach: Timo Liekoski

Netherlands

Head coach: Ruud Kaiser

Group B

France

Head coach: Luc Rabat

Portugal

Head coach: Francisco Alberto Barceló Silveira Ramos

Switzerland

Head coach: Markus Frei

Ukraine

Head coach: Pavlo Yakovenko

Group C

Czech Republic

Head coach: Roman Pucelik

Moldova

Head coach: Petru Efros

Spain

Head coach: Juan Santisteban

FR Yugoslavia

Head coach: Momčilo Vujačić

Group D

Georgia

Head coach: Koba Zhorzhikashvili

Germany

Head coach: Jörg Daniel

Hungary

Head coach: András Sarlos

Poland

Head coach: Andrzej Zamilski

Footnotes

References
RSSSF.com

UEFA European Under-17 Championship squads
Squads